The Dassault Mirage F2 was a French prototype two-seat ground attack/fighter aircraft, which was designed to serve as a test bed for the SNECMA TF306 turbofan engine. The F2 also influenced the subsequent Dassault Mirage G, a variable geometry design.

Design and development

Dassault were tasked in the early 1960s to design a low-altitude intruder that did not have the high approach speeds associated with the delta wing of the Mirage III. Unlike the Mirage III, the F2 had a high-mounted swept wing and horizontal tail surfaces. The prototype powered by a Pratt & Whitney TF30 turbofan first flew on 12 June 1966. It was re-engined with the SNECMA TF306 for the second flight on 29 December 1966.

Two parallel developments were a single-seat Mirage F3 interceptor and a scaled-down and simpler Mirage F1. Eventually the French Air Force chose to develop the French-engined F1, and the F2 did not enter production.

The fuselage and engine from the F2 formed the basis of a variable-geometry variant, the Mirage G.

Aircraft on display
The Mirage F2 is now preserved with DGA Techniques Aeronautiques in Toulouse Balma.

Specifications (Mirage F2 with TF30)

See also

Notes

Bibliography

 
 

1960s French fighter aircraft
Mirage F1
Single-engined jet aircraft
Aircraft first flown in 1966
High-wing aircraft